India is a federal constitutional republic governed under a parliamentary system consisting of 28 states and 8 union territories. All states, as well as the union territories of Jammu and Kashmir, Puducherry and the National Capital Territory of Delhi, have elected legislatures and governments, both patterned on the Westminster model. The remaining five union territories are directly ruled by the central government through appointed administrators. In 1956, under the States Reorganisation Act, states were reorganised on a linguistic basis. Their structure has since remained largely unchanged. Each state or union territory is further divided into administrative districts.

The legislatures of three states Himachal Pradesh, Maharashtra and Uttarakhand meet in different capitals for their summer and winter sessions. Ladakh has both Leh and Kargil as its administrative capitals.

List 
The state and union territory capitals are sorted according to administrative, legislative and judicial capitals. The administrative capital is where the executive government offices are located.

States

Union territories

Notes

Citations

References

External links
 List of states in India

 01
Capitals
India, state and union territory capitals